Eugene Egan (Owen McEgan and other variants) (died 1603) was a Catholic apostolic vicar in Ireland, designated bishop of Ross, County Cork, closely involved with the uprising of the Nine Years' War.

Life
Egan obtained the degrees of Master of Arts and Bachelor of Divinity from a Spanish university. In 1600 he was in Ireland actively encouraging rebellion, meeting Hugh O'Neill, 2nd Earl of Tyrone in February at Tipperary, and co-operating with Florence MacCarthy Reagh.

Tyrone and Florence MacCarthy sent Egan to Rome in quest of an excommunication for all that did not rebel. One result was that the Jesuit Luigi Mansoni was appointed papal nuncio to Ireland. Egan then gained access to the Spanish court at Valladolid, travelling there with Mansoni, and influenced Philip III of Spain, in the direction of sending men and money to Kinsale in 1601, to support the rebellion which Tyrone had raised in the south of Ireland. Pope Clement VIII summoned Egan back to Rome, appointed him apostolic vicar, created him D.D., and conferred on him livings in Munster.

Egan arrived at Kilmakilloge in Kenmare Bay in June 1602, in a ship bringing troops and finance from Spain. Charles Blount, 8th Baron Mountjoy had enjoyed success in the field against Tyrone's rebellion, and Kinsale was closely invested. The rebel forces grew.

Egan's career ended in an encounter with English soldiers under William Taaffe in Carberry on 5 January 1603, where he was killed. He was buried in the convent of Timoleague, in the diocese of Ross, and a small cross was placed above his tomb.

See also
Catholic Church in Ireland

Notes

Attribution

Year of birth missing
1603 deaths
16th-century Irish Roman Catholic priests
Apostolic vicars
17th-century Irish Roman Catholic priests